This is a list of 599 additives that could be added to tobacco cigarettes. The ABC News program Day One first released the list to the public on March 7, 1994. It was submitted to the United States Department of Health and Human Services in April 1994. They are also listed in the documents that are part of the 1998 Tobacco Master Settlement Agreement. It applies, as documented, only to American manufactured cigarettes intended for distribution within the United States by the listed companies. The five major tobacco companies that reported the information were:
 American Tobacco Company
 Brown and Williamson
 Liggett Group, Inc.
 Philip Morris Inc.
 R.J. Reynolds Tobacco Company

One significant issue is that while all these chemical compounds have been approved as additives to food, they were not tested by burning. Burning changes the properties of chemicals. Burning creates additional toxic compounds, including carcinogens. According to the U.S. National Cancer Institute: "Of the more than 7,000 chemicals in tobacco smoke, at least 250 are known to be harmful, including hydrogen cyanide, carbon monoxide, and ammonia. Among the 250 known harmful chemicals in tobacco smoke, at least 69 can cause cancer."

Although many of these additives are used in making cigarettes, each cigarette does not contain all of these additives. Some of these additives are found in cigarettes outside the USA too.

Some American brands are sold in other nations. For example: Marlboro, L&M, Winston, Chesterfield, Kent, and Newport.

A 

 Acetanisole 
 Acetic acid
 Acetoin
 Acetophenone
 6-Acetoxydihydrotheaspirane
 2-Acetyl-3-ethylpyrazine
 2-Acetyl-5-methylfuran
 Acetylpyrazine
 2-Acetylpyridine
 3-Acetylpyridine
 2-Acetylthiazole
 Aconitic acid
 dl-Alanine
 Alfalfa extract
 Allspice extract, oleoresin, and oil
 Allyl hexanoate
 Allyl ionone
 Almond bitter oil
 Ambergris tincture
 Ammonia
 Ammonium bicarbonate
 Ammonium hydroxide
 Ammonium sulfide
 Amyl alcohol
 Amyl butyrate
 Amyl formate
 Amyl octanoate
 alpha-Amylcinnamaldehyde
 Amyris oil
 trans-Anethole
 Angelica root extract, oil and seed oil
 Anise
 Anise star, extract and oils
 Anisyl acetate
 Anisyl alcohol
 Anisyl formate
 Anisyl phenylacetate
 Apple juice concentrate, extract, and skins
 Apricot extract and juice concentrate
 L-Arginine
 Asafetida fluid extract and oil
 Ascorbic acid
 L-Asparagine monohydrate
 L-Aspartic acid

B 
 Balsam of Peru and oil
 Basil oil
 Bay leaf, bay leaf oil, and sweet bay leaf oil
 Beeswax, white
 Beet juice concentrate
 Benzaldehyde
 Benzaldehyde glyceryl acetal
 Benzoic acid
 benzoin
 Benzoin resin
 Benzophenone
 Benzyl alcohol
 Benzyl benzoate
 Benzyl butyrate
 Benzyl cinnamate
 Benzyl propionate
 Benzyl salicylate
 Bergamot oil
 Bisabolene
 Black currant buds absolute
 Borneol
 Bornyl acetate
 Buchu leaf oil
 1,3-Butanediol
 2,3-Butanedione
 1-Butanol
 2-Butanone
 4(2-Butenylidene)-3,5,5-trimethyl-2-cyclohexen-1-one
 Butter, butter esters, and butter oil
 Butyl acetate
 Butyl butyrate
 Butyl butyryl lactate
 Butyl isovalerate
 Butyl phenylacetate
 Butyl undecylenate
 3-Butylidenephthalide
 Butyric acid

C 

 Cadinene
 Caffeine
 Calcium carbonate
 Camphene
 Cananga oil
 Capsicum oleoresin
 Caramel color
 Caraway oil
 Carbon dioxide
 Cardamom oleoresin, extract, seed oil, and powder
 Carob bean and extract
 beta-Carotene
 Carrot oil
 Carvacrol
 4-Carvomenthenol
 L-Carvone
 beta-Caryophyllene
 beta-Caryophyllene oxide
 Cascarilla oil and bark extract
 Cassia bark oil
 Cassie absolute and oil
 Castoreum extract, tincture and absolute
 Cedar leaf oil
 Cedarwood oil terpenes and virginiana
 Cedrol
 Celery Seed extract, solid, oil, And oleoresin
 Cellulose fiber
 Chamomile flower oil and extract
 Chicory extract
 Chocolate
 Cinnamaldehyde
 Cinnamic acid
 Cinnamon leaf oil, bark oil, and extract
 Cinnamyl acetate
 Cinnamyl alcohol
 Cinnamyl cinnamate
 Cinnamyl isovalerate
 Cinnamyl propionate
 Citral
 Citric acid
 Citronella oil
 dl-Citronellol
 Citronellyl butyrate
 Citronellyl isobutyrate
 Civet absolute
 Clary Oil
 Clover tops, red solid extract
 Cocoa
 Cocoa shells, extract, distillate and powder
 Coconut oil
 Coffee
 Cognac white and green oil
 Copaiba oil
 Coriander extract and oil
 Corn oil
 Corn silk
 Costus root oil
 Cubeb oil
 Cuminaldehyde
 para-Cymene
 L-Cysteine

D 

 Dandelion root solid extract
 Davana oil
 2-trans,4-trans-Decadienal
 delta-Decalactone
 gamma-Decalactone
 Decanal
 Decanoic acid
 1-Decanol
 2-Decenal
 Dehydromenthofurolactone
 Diacetyl
 Diammonium phosphate
 Diethyl malonate
 Diethyl sebacate
 2,3-Diethylpyrazine
 Dihydro anethole
 5,7-Dihydro-2-methylthieno(3,4-D) pyrimidine
 Dill seed oil and extract
 meta-Dimethoxybenzene
 para-Dimethoxybenzene
 2,6-Dimethoxyphenol
 Dimethyl succinate
 3,4-Dimethyl-1,2-cyclopentanedione
 3,5-Dimethyl-1,2-cyclopentanedione
 3,7-Dimethyl-1,3,6-octatriene
 4,5-Dimethyl-3-hydroxy-2,5-dihydrofuran-2-one
 6,10-Dimethyl-5,9-undecadien-2-one
 3,7-Dimethyl-6-octenoic acid
 2,4 Dimethylacetophenone
 alpha,para-Dimethylbenzyl alcohol
 alpha,alpha-Dimethylphenethyl acetate
 alpha,alpha-Dimethylphenethyl butyrate
 2,3-Dimethylpyrazine
 2,5-Dimethylpyrazine
 2,6-Dimethylpyrazine
 Dimethyltetrahydrobenzofuranone
 delta-Dodecalactone
 gamma-Dodecalactone

E 
 para-Ethoxybenzaldehyde
 Ethyl 10-undecenoate
 Ethyl 2-methylbutyrate
 Ethyl acetate
 Ethyl acetoacetate
 Ethyl alcohol
 Ethyl benzoate
 Ethyl butyrate
 Ethyl cinnamate
 Ethyl decanoate
 Ethyl fenchol
 Ethyl furoate
 Ethyl heptanoate
 Ethyl hexanoate
 Ethyl isovalerate
 Ethyl lactate
 Ethyl laurate
 Ethyl levulinate
 Ethyl maltol
 Ethyl methylphenylglycidate
 Ethyl myristate
 Ethyl nonanoate
 Ethyl octadecanoate
 Ethyl octanoate
 Ethyl oleate
 Ethyl palmitate
 Ethyl phenylacetate
 Ethyl propionate
 Ethyl salicylate
 Ethyl trans-2-butenoate
 Ethyl valerate
 Ethyl vanillin
 2-Ethyl (or methyl)-(3,5 and 6)-methoxypyrazine
 2-Ethyl-1-Hexanol,3-ethyl-2-hydroxy-2-cyclopenten-1-one
 2-Ethyl-3,(5 or 6)-dimethylpyrazine
 5-Ethyl-3-hydroxy-4-methyl-2(5H)-furanone
 2-Ethyl-3-methylpyrazine
 3-Ethylpyridine
 4-Ethylbenzaldehyde
 4-Ethylguaiacol
 4-Ethylphenol (para-ethylphenol)
 Eucalyptol

F 
 Farnesol
 D-Fenchone
 Fennel sweet oil
 Fenugreek, extract, resin, and absolute
 Fig juice concentrate
 Food starch modified
 Furfuryl Mercaptan
 4-(2-Furyl)-3-buten-2-one

G 
 Galbanum oil
 Genet absolute
 Gentian root extract
 Geraniol
 Geranium rose oil
 Geranyl acetate
 Geranyl butyrate
 Geranyl formate
 Geranyl isovalerate
 Geranyl phenylacetate
 Ginger oil and oleoresin
 L-Glutamic acid
 L-Glutamine
 Glycerol
 Glycyrrhizin ammoniated
 Grape juice concentrate
 Guaiac wood oil
 Guaiacol
 Guar gum

H 

 2,4-Heptadienal
 gamma-Heptalactone
 Heptanoic acid
 2-Heptanone
 3-Hepten-2-One
 2-Hepten-4-One
 4-Heptenal
 trans-2-Heptenal
 Heptyl acetate
 omega-6-Hexadecenlactone
 gamma-Hexalactone
 Hexanal
 Hexanoic acid
 2-Hexen-1-Ol
 3-Hexen-1-Ol
 cis-3-Hexen-1-yl acetate
 2-Hexenal
 3-Hexenoic acid
 trans-2-Hexenoic acid
 cis-3-Hexenyl formate
 Hexyl 2-methylbutyrate
 Hexyl acetate
 Hexyl alcohol
 Hexyl phenylacetate
 L-Histidine
 Honey
 Hops oil
 Hydrolyzed milk solids
 Hydrolyzed plant proteins
 5-Hydroxy-2,4-decadienoic acid delta-lactone
 4-Hydroxy-2,5-dimethyl-3(2H)-furanone
 2-Hydroxy-3,5,5-trimethyl-2-cyclohexen-1-one
 4-Hydroxy-3-pentenoic Acid lactone
 2-Hydroxy-4-methylbenzaldehyde
 4-Hydroxybutanoic acid lactone
 Hydroxycitronellal
 6-Hydroxydihydrotheaspirane
 4-(para-Hydroxyphenyl)-2-butanone
 Hyssop oil

I 
 Immortelle absolute and extract
 alpha-Ionone
 beta-Ionone
 alpha-Irone
 Isoamyl acetate
 Isoamyl benzoate
 Isoamyl butyrate
 Isoamyl cinnamate
 Isoamyl formate
 Isoamyl hexanoate
 Isoamyl isovalerate
 Isoamyl octanoate
 Isoamyl phenylacetate
 Isobornyl acetate
 Isobutyl acetate
 Isobutyl alcohol
 Isobutyl cinnamate
 Isobutyl phenylacetate
 Isobutyl salicylate
 2-Isobutyl-3-methoxypyrazine
 alpha-Isobutyl phenethyl alcohol
 Isobutyraldehyde
 Isobutyric Acid
 d,l-Isoleucine
 alpha-Isomethyl ionone
 2-Isopropylphenol
 Isovaleric acid

J 
 Jasmine absolute, concrete and oil

K 
 Kola nut extract

L 
 Labdanum absolute and oleoresin
 Lactic acid
 Lauric acid
 Lauric aldehyde
 Lavandin oil
 Lavender oil
 Lemon oil and extract
 Lemongrass oil
 L-Leucine
 Levulinic acid
 Liquorice root, fluid, extract and powder
 Lime Oil
 Linalool
 Linalool oxide
 Linalyl acetate
 Linden flowers
 Lovage oil and extract
 L-Lysine

M 
 Mace powder, extract and oil
 Magnesium carbonate
 Malic acid
 Malt and malt extract
 Maltodextrin
 Maltol
 Maltyl isobutyrate
 Mandarin oil
 Maple syrup and concentrate
 Mate leaf, absolute and oil
 para-Mentha-8-Thiol-3-One
 Menthol
 Menthone
 Menthyl acetate
 dl-Methionine
 Methoprene
 2-Methoxy-4-methylphenol
 2-Methoxy-4-vinylphenol
 para-Methoxybenzaldehyde
 1-(para-Methoxyphenyl)-1-penten-3-one
 4-(para-Methoxyphenyl)-2-butanone
 1-(para-Methoxyphenyl)-2-propanone
 Methoxypyrazine
 Methyl 2-furoate
 Methyl 2-octynoate
 Methyl 2-pyrrolyl ketone
 Methyl anisate
 Methyl anthranilate
 Methyl benzoate
 Methyl cinnamate
 Methyl dihydrojasmonate
 Methyl ester of rosin, partially hydrogenated
 Methyl isovalerate
 Methyl linoleate (48%)
 Methyl linolenate (52%) mixture
 Methyl naphthyl ketone
 Methyl nicotinate
 Methyl phenylacetate
 Methyl salicylate
 Methyl sulfide
 3-Methyl-1-cyclopentadecanone
 4-Methyl-1-phenyl-2-pentanone
 5-Methyl-2-phenyl-2-hexenal
 5-Methyl-2-thiophenecarboxaldehyde
 6-Methyl-3,-5-heptadien-2-one
 2-Methyl-3-(para-isopropylphenyl) propionaldehyde
 5-Methyl-3-hexen-2-one
 1-Methyl-3-methoxy-4-isopropylbenzene
 4-Methyl-3-pentene-2-one
 2-Methyl-4-phenylbutyraldehyde
 6-methyl-5-hepten-2-one
 4-Methyl-5-thiazoleethanol
 4-Methyl-5-vinylthiazole
 Methyl-alpha-ionone
 Methyl-trans-2-butenoic acid
 4-Methylacetophenone
 para-Methylanisole
 alpha-Methylbenzyl acetate
 alpha-Methylbenzyl alcohol
 2-Methylbutyraldehyde
 3-Methylbutyraldehyde
 2-Methylbutyric acid
 alpha-Methylcinnamaldehyde
 Methylcyclopentenolone
 2-Methylheptanoic acid
 2-Methylhexanoic acid
 3-Methylpentanoic acid
 4-Methylpentanoic acid
 2-Methylpyrazine
 5-Methylquinoxaline
 2-Methyltetrahydrofuran-3-one
 (Methylthio)Methylpyrazine (mixture of isomers)
 3-Methylthiopropionaldehyde
 Methyl 3-methylthiopropionate
 2-Methylvaleric acid
 Mimosa absolute and extract
 Molasses extract and tincture
 Mountain maple solid extract
 Mullein flowers
 Myristaldehyde
 Myristic acid
 Myrrh oil

N 
 beta-Napthyl ethyl ether
 Nerol
 Neroli bigarde oil
 Nerolidol
 Nona-2-trans,6-cis-dienal
 2,6-Nonadien-1-ol
 gamma-Nonalactone
 Nonanal
 Nonanoic acid
 Nonanone
 trans-2-Nonen-1-ol
 2-Nonenal
 Nonyl acetate
 Nutmeg powder and oil

O 
 Oak chips extract and oil
 Oakmoss absolute
 9,12-Octadecadienoic acid (48%) and 9,12,15-octadecatrienoic acid (52%)
 delta-Octalactone
 gamma-Octalactone
 Octanal
 Octanoic acid
 1-Octanol
 2-Octanone
 3-Octen-2-one
 1-Octen-3-ol
 1-Octen-3-yl acetate
 2-Octenal
 Octyl isobutyrate
 Oleic acid
 Olibanum oil
 Opoponax oil and gum
 Orange blossom water, absolute, and leaf absolute
 Orange oil and extract
 Origanum oil
 Orris concrete oil and root extract

P 
 Palmarosa oil
 Palmitic acid
 Parsley seed oil
 Patchouli oil
 omega-Pentadecalactone
 2,3-Pentanedione
 2-Pentanone
 4-Pentenoic acid
 2-Pentylpyridine
 Pepper oil, black and white
 Peppermint oil
 Peruvian (Bois de Rose) oil
 Petitgrain absolute, Mandarin oil, and terpeneless oil
 alpha-Phellandrene
 2-Phenenthyl acetate
 Phenethyl alcohol
 Phenethyl butyrate
 Phenethyl cinnamate
 Phenethyl isobutyrate
 Phenethyl isovalerate
 Phenethyl phenylacetate
 Phenethyl salicylate
 1-Phenyl-1-propanol
 3-Phenyl-1-propanol
 2-Phenyl-2-butenal
 4-Phenyl-3-buten-2-ol
 4-Phenyl-3-buten-2-one
 Phenylacetaldehyde
 Phenylacetic acid
 L-Phenylalanine
 3-Phenylpropionaldehyde
 3-Phenylpropionic acid
 3-Phenylpropyl acetate
 3-Phenylpropyl cinnamate
 2-(3-Phenylpropyl)Tetrahydrofuran
 Phosphoric acid
 Pimenta leaf oil
 Pine needle oil
 Pine oil, Scotch
 Pineapple juice concentrate
 alpha-Pinene, beta-Pinene
 D-Piperitone
 Piperonal
 Pipsissewa leaf extract
 Plum juice
 Potassium sorbate
 L-Proline
 Propenylguaethol
 Propionic acid
 Propyl acetate
 Propyl para-hydroxybenzoate
 Propylene glycol
 3-Propylidenephthalide
 Prune juice and concentrate
 Pyridine
 Pyroligneous acid and extract
 Pyrrole
 Pyruvic acid

R 
 Raisin juice concentrate
 Rhodinol
 Rose absolute and oil
 Rosemary oil
 Rum
 Rum ether
 Rye extract

S 
 Sage, sage oil, and sage oleoresin
 Salicylaldehyde
 Sandalwood oil, yellow
 Sclareolide
 Skatole
 Smoke flavor
 Snakeroot oil
 Sodium acetate
 Sodium benzoate
 Sodium bicarbonate
 Sodium carbonate
 Sodium chloride
 Sodium citrate
 Sodium hydroxide
 Solanone
 Spearmint oil
 Styrax extract, gum and oil
 Sucrose octaacetate
 Sugar alcohols
 Sugars

T 
 Tagetes oil
 Tannic acid
 Tartaric acid
 Tea leaf and absolute
 alpha-Terpineol
 Terpinolene
 Terpinyl acetate
 5,6,7,8-Tetrahydroquinoxaline
 1,5,5,9-Tetramethyl-13-oxatricyclo(8.3.0.0(4,9))tridecane
 2,3,4,5- and 3,4,5,6-Tetramethylethyl-cyclohexanone
 2,3,5,6-Tetramethylpyrazine
 Thiamine hydrochloride
 Thiazole
 L-Threonine
 Thyme oil, white and red
 Thymol
 Tobacco extracts
 Tocopherols (mixed)
 Tolu balsam gum and extract
 Tolualdehydes
 para-Tolyl 3-methylbutyrate
 para-Tolyl acetaldehyde
 para-Tolyl acetate
 para-Tolyl isobutyrate
 para-Tolyl phenylacetate
 Triacetin
 2-Tridecanone
 2-Tridecenal
 Triethyl citrate
 3,5,5-Trimethyl-1-hexanol
 para,alpha,alpha-Trimethylbenzyl alcohol
 4-(2,6,6-Trimethylcyclohex-1-enyl)but-2-en-4-one
 2,6,6-Trimethylcyclohex-2-ene-1,4-dione
 2,6,6-Trimethylcyclohexa-1,3-dienyl methanal
 4-(2,6,6-Trimethylcyclohexa-1,3-dienyl)but-2-en-4-one
 2,2,6-Trimethylcyclohexanone
 2,3,5-Trimethylpyrazine
 L-Tyrosine

U 
 delta-Undecalactone
 gamma-Undecalactone
 Undecanal
 2-Undecanone
 10-Undecenal
 Urea

V 
 Valencene
 Valeraldehyde
 Valerian root extract, oil, and powder
 Valeric acid
 gamma-Valerolactone
 Valine
 Vanilla extract and oleoresin
 Vanillin
 Veratraldehyde
 Vetiver oil
 Vinegar
 Violet leaf absolute

W 
 Walnut hull extract
 Water
 Wheat extract and flour
 Wild cherry bark extract
 Wine and wine sherry

X 
 Xanthan gum
 3,4-Xylenol

Y 
 Yeast

See also 
 List of food additives
 List of cigarette smoke carcinogens
 Health effects of tobacco smoking
 Tobacco harm reduction
 Composition of electronic cigarette aerosol
 Tobacco packaging warning messages

References

External links 
 Making cigarettes. Philip Morris International. List of ingredients by market and brand. Scroll down to "Product ingredient finder". Pick country. Download ingredient list for that country. Open it, and scroll down for ingredients by brand. 

Chemistry-related lists
Smoking

Health-related lists
Cigarettes
Health effects of tobacco